The 2016 APB and WSB Olympic Qualifier for the boxing tournament at the 2016 Summer Olympics in Rio de Janeiro, Brazil, was held between July 3 and July 8, 2016 in  Vargas, Venezuela.

Medal table

Qualified boxers

   Boxer qualified for the 2016 Summer Olympics

Summary

Results

Light flyweight (49 kg)
The top three boxers will qualify for the 2016 Summer Olympics.

Flyweight (52 kg)
The top three boxers will qualify for the 2016 Summer Olympics.

Bantamweight (56 kg)
The top three boxers will qualify for the 2016 Summer Olympics.

Lightweight (60 kg)
The top three boxers will qualify for the 2016 Summer Olympics.

Light welterweight (64 kg)
The top three boxers will qualify for the 2016 Summer Olympics.

Welterweight (69 kg)
The top three boxers will qualify for the 2016 Summer Olympics.

Middleweight (75 kg)
The top three boxers will qualify for the 2016 Summer Olympics.

Light heavyweight (81 kg)
The top three boxers will qualify for the 2016 Summer Olympics.

Heavyweight (91 kg)
The winner will qualify for the 2016 Summer Olympics.

Super heavyweight (+91 kg)
The winner will qualify for the 2016 Summer Olympics.

References

Boxing qualification for the 2016 Summer Olympics
International sports competitions hosted by Venezuela
2016 in Venezuelan sport
Vargas (state)